TNT, also referred to as TNT II, is the second self-titled studio album by the Brazilian rock band TNT, released in 1988 by RCA Records. Their last release with original drummer Felipe Jotz, it sees the band shifting away from their previous "juvenile" rockabilly sound towards a more "mature" direction influenced by pop rock, a trend which would culminate in their subsequent release, 1991's Noite Vem, Noite Vai. "A Irmã do Dr. Robert" was the album's greatest hit, and led TNT to play at the popular TV show Globo de Ouro in 1988.

The album's opening track, "Não Vai Mais Sorrir (Pra Mim)", counts with a guest appearance by famous musician Lulu Santos.

Track listing

Personnel
 Charles Master – vocals, bass guitar
 Márcio Petracco – electric guitar, pedal steel guitar, dobro, banjo
 Luís Henrique "Tchê" Gomes – electric guitar
 Felipe Jotz – drums
 Lulu Santos – additional vocals (track 1)
 Reinaldo B. Brito – production
 Miguel Plopschi – art direction

References

1988 albums
TNT (Brazilian band) albums
RCA Records albums